The 2010 Washington State Cougars football team represented Washington State University in the 2010 NCAA Division I FBS football season. Head coach Paul Wulff was in his third season and they were members of the Pacific-10 Conference. The team played its home games on campus at Martin Stadium in Pullman, Washington. The Cougars finished the season 2–10, 1–8 in Pac-10 play.

Schedule

Game summaries

Oklahoma State

Montana State

SMU

USC

UCLA

After scoring 21 unanswered points to lead the Bruins 28-20, the Cougars were unable to hold the lead. The Bruins came back with three touchdowns in the last half for the victory.

Oregon

Arizona

Stanford

Arizona State

California

Oregon State

The Cougars came into Corvallis with a 1-9 record, and a 16-game Pac-10 losing streak. The Cougars took control of the game early, with a 14-0 lead. The Cougars would walk away with a 31-14 victory against the Beavers, ending the 16 game conference losing streak.

Washington

References

Washington State
Washington State Cougars football seasons
Washington State Cougars football